José Luis Barceló Camacho (born 1959) is a Colombian lawyer and academic, former president of the Supreme Court of Justice of Colombia.

Personal life
Barceló was born to José Barceló from Spain, and Lilia Camacho from Boyacá. Barceló and his first wife had a daughter Sonia Carolina, who died in 2003 aged 17.

Career
Barceló is a graduate of the Nueva Granada Military University in Bogotá, Colombia. Barceló joined the Supreme Court of Justice of Colombia in 1991, and has worked as Criminal Examining Judge of Bogotá and Advocate Counsel of the Second Delegate Procurator for the Criminal Function. From 2011 to 2018, he worked for the Criminal Chamber of the Supreme Court, including working as assistant magistrate to Fernando Arboleda Ripoll. In January 2018, Barceló was appointed as president of the Supreme Court of Justice of Colombia, replacing Rigoberto Echeverry. He began the role in June 2018. Barceló is currently also a professor of the Specialisation in Constitutional Criminal Procedure and Military Justice of the Nueva Granada Military University.

References

1959 births
20th-century Colombian judges
Colombian academics
Academic staff of the Free University of Colombia
Magistrates of the Supreme Court of Justice of Colombia
Presidents of the Supreme Court of Justice of Colombia
Living people
21st-century Colombian judges